Murchad mac Diarmata (English: Murrough MacDermot) (died 1070) was a late eleventh-century ruler of the kingdoms of Leinster, Dublin, and the Isles. He was a member of the Uí Chennselaig, and a son of Diarmait mac Máel na mBó, King of Leinster (died 1072). Murchad had three sons: Domnall (died 1075), Donnchad (died 1115), and Énna. He is the eponymous founder of the Meic Murchada, a branch of the Uí Chennselaig who adopted the surname Mac Murchada (MacMurrough, MacMorrow, Morrow).

Murchad led an army into the Kingdom of Meath in July 1069 "where he burned territories and churches", he was however badly wounded by Feichin, a defender. It was probably these injuries, or complications, that led to Murchad's death in 1070. He was then buried in Áth Cliath, near what is now Dublin.

Murchad's death in the Annals of the Four Masters

Sources
http://www.ucc.ie/celt/published/T100005B/index.html
"Irish Kings and High Kings", Francis John Bryne, Dublin, 1973.
Ancestral Roots of Certain American Colonists Who Came to America Before 1700 by Frederick Lewis Weis, Line 175-4.

1070 deaths
11th-century rulers of the Kingdom of the Isles
People from County Wexford
11th-century Irish monarchs
Kings of Leinster
Monarchs of Dublin
MacMorrough Kavanagh dynasty
Uí Ceinnselaig
Year of birth unknown
Monarchs killed in action